Archephia is a genus of moths of the family Noctuidae. Its only species, Archephia basilinea, is known from South Africa. Both the genus and the species were first described by George Hampson, the genus in 1926 and the species in 1902.

References

Endemic moths of South Africa
Catocalinae
Monotypic moth genera